Vapreotide (Sanvar) is a synthetic somatostatin analog. It is used in the treatment of esophageal variceal bleeding in patients with cirrhotic liver disease and AIDS-related diarrhea.

It is an 8 residue peptide with sequence H-D-Phe-Cys(1)-Tyr-D-Trp-Lys-Val-Cys(1)-Trp-NH2.

References

Antineoplastic drugs
Lactams
Peptides
Somatostatin receptor agonists